The Bukovica is the longest river in the municipality of Šavnik, Montenegro. It originates under the Ranisava mountain, passes through the town Šavnik and flows into the Komarnica near the village Duži. It is 42 km long. Its main tributaries are Šavnik and Bijela.

References

Rivers of Montenegro